Phichit is a town in northern Thailand.

Phichit may also refer to:

Phichit Province, Thailand
Amphoe Mueang Phichit, the capital district of Phichit Province